Riverside Museum at Blake's Lock is a museum located at Blake's Lock in the town of Reading, in the English county of Berkshire. The museum contains information about the history of human activity on the Kennet and the Thames rivers in Reading.

The museum is located in two historical buildings: the Screen House and the Turbine House.  Exhibits include information about Romani people, examples of medieval uses of the river, and temporary art exhibits.

References

External links 

Museums established in 1883
Museums in Reading, Berkshire
Reading
River Thames
Technology museums in the United Kingdom
1883 establishments in England